Zoneait (pronounced "zone-eight" and meaning "large tooth" in the Kiowa language) is an extinct genus of thalattosuchian crocodylomorph known from a single species, Zoneait nargorum, from the Middle Jurassic of Oregon. Z. nargorum was named in 2015 by paleontologist Eric Wilberg on the basis of several partial skulls, vertebrae, and forelimb bones that were found in an outcrop of the Snowshoe Formation near the town of Izee. It is a member of Metriorhynchoidea, a clade of marine-adapted thalattosuchians that existed until the Early Cretaceous. The skeleton of Zoneait possesses several adaptations for offshore marine life but retains features characteristic of its land-living ancestors, indicating that it is a transitional form between the fully marine metriorhynchids of the late Middle Jurassic to Early Cretaceous, and earlier non-marine crocodylomorphs. The Snowshoe Formation was deposited in a shallow marine environment within a tropical forearc basin, suggesting that Zoneait was a marine predator.

Wilberg found that Zoneait is the sister taxon of Metriorhynchidae, which suggests that it should have been more extensively adapted to marine life than Teleidosaurus and Eoneustes were, but less adapted than true metriorhynchids like Metriorhynchus and Cricosaurus, which were fully marine. Zoneait has a streamlined skull with eyes that faced laterally like those of metriorhynchids, unlike the more upward-facing eyes of other non-marine aquatic crocodylomorphs. The shift in eye orientation is thought to reflect changes in feeding ecology; upward-facing eyes would have been adaptive for aquatic crocodylomorphs ambushing land-living prey from beneath the surface of the water, whereas side-facing eyes would have been adaptive for marine crocodylomorphs hunting in open marine environments. The forelimbs are not flattened into paddles as in metriorhynchids, but the ulna (lower arm bone) is reduced in length, indicating that forelimb reduction began at the lower limb and progressed upward (the humerus or upper arm bone of Zoneait not reduced). Taken together, the transitional features of Zoneait indicate that metriorhynchoids' adaptation of a marine lifestyle began with a shift in feeding ecology and only later involved changes in swimming locomotion.

References

Jurassic animals of North America
Monotypic prehistoric reptile genera
Prehistoric marine crocodylomorphs
Middle Jurassic crocodylomorphs
Fossil taxa described in 2015
Thalattosuchians
Paleontology in Oregon
Prehistoric pseudosuchian genera